Hiro is a Canadian short film, written and directed by Matthew Swanson and released in 2005. The film centres on Hiro (Hiro Kanagawa), a shy Japanese insect collector who finds himself thrust into a wild chase to recover a stolen beetle after a chance encounter with a young girl (Vicky Huang).

The film's dialogue is in Japanese, although Swanson does not personally speak the language. Swanson described it as "liberating" to direct in a language he did not understand.

The film premiered at the 2005 Toronto International Film Festival.

Awards
The film was nominated for a Genie Award for Best Live Action Short Drama.

It also won the award for Best Short Film at the 2006 SXSW Film Festival, and was the first Canadian film to win the "Spirit of Slamdance" Audience Award at the Slamdance Film Festival.

References

External links
 Official Movie Website
 

Canadian independent films
2005 short films
2005 films
Canadian drama short films
2000s Canadian films